Volver is a 2018 album by Plácido Domingo with Pablo Sáinz Villegas.
Conductor & arranger : Nazareno Andorno

Track listing

"Sabor a mí", 1959 bolero
"Nunca"  by Guty Cárdenas
Valeria's bossa
Coimbra
"Adiós Granada"
Una limosna por el amor de Dios
La morena de mi copla
"Guantanamera"
"Historia de un amor"
Gracias a la vida
"Volver"

References

2018 albums
Plácido Domingo albums
Collaborative albums